The Women's Doubles was one of five events at the 1914 World Hard Court Championships. Suzanne Lenglen and Elizabeth Ryan won the inaugural title, defeating twin sisters Blanche Amblard and Suzanne Amblard 6–0, 6–0 in the final.

Draw

Draw

References

Women's Doubles